The 2017 Waterford Senior Hurling Championship is the 117th staging of the Waterford Senior Hurling Championship since its establishment by the Waterford County Board in 1887.

Group stage

Group 1

Group 1 Table

Round 1 Group 1

Round 2 Group 1

Round 3 Group 1

Round 4 Group 1

Round 5 Group 1

Group 2

Group 2 Table

Round 1 Group 2

Round 2 Group 2

Round 3 Group 2

Round 4 Group 2

Round 5 Group 2

Knockout stage

Quarter-finals

Semi-finals

Final

Waterford
Waterford Senior Hurling Championship